Thoressa hyrie is a butterfly in the family Hesperiidae. It was described by Lionel de Nicéville in 1891. It is found in the Indomalayan realm (southeast Tibet, northern Thailand and Laos).

References

External links
Thoressa at Markku Savela's Lepidoptera and Some Other Life Forms

hyrie
Butterflies described in 1891